The 2020 LA Galaxy II season was the club's seventh season of existence, and their seventh season in the USL Championship, the second tier of the United States Soccer Pyramid.

On March 12, 2020 the USL announced the decision to suspend the 2020 season for a minimum of 30 days due to the COVID-19 pandemic in the United States.

On June 19, 2020, the USL announced that the season will restart on July 11.

Squad information

Transfers

Transfers in

Transfers out

Competitions

Friendlies

USL Championship

Standings

Regular season 
On December 20, 2019, the USL announced the 2020 season schedule.

All times in Pacific Time Zone.

Group stage 
On June 25, 2020 the USL announced the groups alignment for the resumption of play after the COVID-19 pandemic in the United States stopped the regular season. The top two teams in the group qualifies for the postseason.

Playoffs

See also 
 2020 in American soccer
 2020 LA Galaxy season

References

External links 
 

LA Galaxy II seasons
LA Galaxy II
LA Galaxy II
LA Galaxy II